Appropriate Rural Technology Institute (ARTI) is an Indian non-governmental organization founded by a group of about 20 scientists and technologists to develop innovative and environmentally friendly rural technologies based on modern scientific knowledge in 1996. For its work in sustainable energy, ARTI has won two Ashden Awards.

References

External links 
 

Organisations based in Pune
Nature conservation organisations based in India
1996 establishments in Maharashtra
Organizations established in 1996